Parathalassiinae is a subfamily of flies in the family Dolichopodidae. It is part of an extended concept of the family, Dolichopodidae sensu lato, and forms a monophyletic group with Dolichopodidae sensu stricto. It was once placed provisionally in the subfamily Microphorinae as the tribe Parathalassiini.

According to Germann et al. (2011), there is strong evidence for placing Parathalassiinae within Dolichopodidae sensu stricto.

Genera
The subfamily currently includes 12 genera:
Amphithalassius Ulrich, 1991
†Archichrysotus Negrobov, 1978
Chimerothalassius Shamshev & Grootaert, 2003
†Cretomicrophorus Negrobov, 1978
†Electrophorella Cumming & Brooks, 2002
Eothalassius Shamshev & Grootaert, 2005
Microphorella Becker, 1909
Neothalassius Brooks & Cumming, 2016
Parathalassius Mik, 1891
Plesiothalassius Ulrich, 1991
†Retinitus Negrobov, 1978
Thalassophorus Saigusa, 1986

References

External links
 

 
Dolichopodidae subfamilies